Johanna Ropner (née Stroyan) is a businessperson and the lord lieutenant for North Yorkshire.

Life
Ropner, the second of three children, was born on 3 January 1963 to Colin Strathearn Ropner Stroyan and Caroline Jane Brownlow. She attended Newcastle University where she graduated with an honours degree in agriculture.

Ropner was confirmed as the successor to Barry Dodd in November 2018. The vacancy had arisen after Dodd died in a helicopter crash, and Ropner had previously been a deputy lord-lieutenant of North Yorkshire under Dodd, and his predecessor, Lord Crathorne.

Personal life
Ropner lives in Kirklington with her husband, Robert Ropner.  The couple are third cousins. Together they have three grown-up children.

References

External links
NYLL webpage

Lord-Lieutenants of North Yorkshire
1963 births
 
Living people